Hénouville is a commune in the Seine-Maritime department in the Normandy region in northern France.

Geography

Population

Places of interest
 The church of St.Michel, dating from the sixteenth century.
 A fifteenth-century manoir.
 Two sixteenth-century houses.
 An ancient presbytery and 17th-century dovecote.
 Two châteaux: du Perrey and de La Fontaine.

See also
Communes of the Seine-Maritime department

Bibliography

References

External links

Official website of Hénouville 
Another website about Hénouville 

Communes of Seine-Maritime